The Hididel is a left tributary of the river Pârâul Rece in Romania. It discharges into the Poiana Ruscă Reservoir, which is drained by the Pârâul Rece.

References

Rivers of Romania
Rivers of Caraș-Severin County